Martin Schmidt (born 24 May 1983) is a German former footballer who played as a defender.

References

External links
 

1983 births
Living people
Sportspeople from Heilbronn
German footballers
Association football defenders
SV Wacker Burghausen players
3. Liga players
Footballers from Baden-Württemberg